The 1844 United States presidential election in Illinois took place between November 1 and December 4, 1844, as part of the 1844 United States presidential election. Voters chose nine representatives, or electors to the Electoral College, who voted for President and Vice President.

Illinois voted for the Democratic candidate, James K. Polk, over Whig candidate Henry Clay. Polk won Illinois by a margin of 11.86%.

Results

See also
 United States presidential elections in Illinois

References

Illinois
1844
1844 Illinois elections